The 2012–13 Slovak Extraliga season was the 20th season of the Slovak Extraliga, the highest level of ice hockey in Slovakia.

Regular season

Standings

Key - GP: Games played, W: Wins, OTW/SOW: Overtime/Shootout wins, OTL/SOL: Overtime/Shootout losses, L: Losses, GF: Goals for, GA: Goals against, PTS: Points.

Statistics

Scoring leaders
 
GP = Games played; G = Goals; A = Assists; Pts = Points; +/– = Plus/minus; PIM = Penalty minutes

Leading goaltenders 
These are the leaders in GAA among goaltenders that have played at least 1200 minutes.

GP = Games played; TOI = Time on ice (minutes); GA = Goals against; Sv% = Save percentage; GAA = Goals against average

Playoffs

Playoff bracket

Quarterfinals (best-of-seven)
Zvolen – Banská Bystrica 4–1 (1–2, 2–1, 4–0, 3–2, 3–2PS)
Piešťany – Skalica 4–3 (5–1, 1–4, 3–2PS, 0–4, 4–5, 3–0, 4–1)
Košice – Poprad 4–3 (2–1, 2–1, 2–4, 3–6, 3–2, 0–3, 3–1)
Nitra – Trenčín 4–0 (2–1, 2–0, 4–0, 4–1)

Semifinals (best-of-seven)
Zvolen – Piešťany 4–3 (2–1, 3–4PS, 3–2PS, 1–6, 2–1PS, 0–4, 5–0)
Košice – Nitra 4–1 (3–5, 2–1PS, 7–4, 3–2PS, 6–3)

Finals (best-of-seven)
Zvolen – Košice 4–1 (2–1PS, 2–1, 3–2, 2–6, 2–1)

Playoff statistics

Playoff scoring leaders

Relegation round
In the relegation round the 10th place team MHC Martin played against the 1.Liga champion HC 46 Bardejov.

MHC Martin vs. HC 46 Bardejov

Attendance
Source:

All-Stars Team
Source:

Final rankings

References

External links
 

Slovak Extraliga seasons
3